Estadio Armando Barillas is a soccer stadium located in Escuintla, Guatemala. It was built in 1999 and seats 10,000.

Armando Barillas
Sports venues completed in 1999
1999 establishments in Guatemala